Pseudotropheus minutus is a species of cichlid endemic to Lake Malawi.  It prefers areas with rocky substrates where it can feed on algae, particularly in areas other species cannot access.  It can reach a length of  SL.  It can also be found in the aquarium trade.

References

minutus
minutus
Fish of Lake Malawi
Fish of Malawi
Fish described in 1956
Taxa named by Geoffrey Fryer
Taxobox binomials not recognized by IUCN
Taxonomy articles created by Polbot